Lamballe-Armor is a commune in the Côtes-d'Armor department in Brittany in northwestern France. It was established on 1 January 2019 by merger of the former communes of Lamballe (the seat), Morieux and Planguenoual.

Population

References

Communes of Côtes-d'Armor

Communes nouvelles of Côtes-d'Armor
Populated places established in 2019
2019 establishments in France